Christopher Murray (born March 19, 1957) is an American actor. He is the son of actors Don Murray and Hope Lange, as well as the stepson of film director Alan J. Pakula, Lange's second husband.

He appeared in a number of notable films, beginning with Pakula's 1976 film All the President's Men. He appeared in two other films directed by Pakula, See You in the Morning (1989) and The Pelican Brief (1993). He has also appeared in the films I Am the Cheese (1983), And God Created Woman (1988), Just Cause and Virtuosity (both 1995) and Dante's Peak (1997).

He has also guest starred in a number of notable television series that include, Knots Landing, China Beach, L.A. Law, Murder, She Wrote, JAG, NCIS, Beverly Hills, 90210, The West Wing, 24, 7th Heaven, Crossing Jordan, Parks and Recreation, Beyond Belief: Fact or Fiction and Mad Men. From 2005 to 2008, Murray had a recurring role as Dean Rivers on the Nickelodeon series Zoey 101, appearing on the show throughout its four-season run.

References

External links
 
 

1957 births
Living people
20th-century American male actors
21st-century American male actors
Male actors from Los Angeles
American male film actors
American male television actors